The Nike Football Academy was an English football academy funded and administered by Nike, Inc. The academy had a revolving squad of unsigned under-20 players and was run with the intention of helping them find a professional club. The academy was based at St George's Park National Football Centre. The squad was made up of players scouted worldwide and drafted to the squad through Nike Most Wanted trials. Over 50 players have gone on to play professional football over the years. The programme was led by Manager Jon Goodman, with former Wolverhampton Wanderers player Matt Murray who worked as Assistant Manager.

The programme was also known for its collaborations with top class professional players, including Sami Khedira, Joe Hart, Rio Ferdinand, Francesco Totti, Mario Gotze and others. Players such as David Accam, Tom Rogic, Majeed Waris, Petar Golubovic and Kevin Salazar are graduates of the programme.

The academy regularly played exhibition matches facing teams like FC Barcelona, Arsenal, Inter Milan, Manchester United and others.

The academy closed at the end of the 2016–17 season.

Technical staff

Notable participants

 Dejan Pandurevic
 Tom Rogic
 Dario Van den Buijs
 Alvin Fortes
 Josip Juranović
 Conor Branson
 Sean Clare
 David Goldsmith
 Jorge Grant
 Billy Ions
 Alex Parsons
 Jordan Rose
 Bilal Sayoud
 Ryan Sellers
 Jordan Tillson
 Alex Whittle
 Youssef Ezzejjari
 Fabian Senninger
 David Accam
 Abdul Majeed Waris
 Dimitris Komnos
 Siriki Dembélé
 Evan Dimas
 Muhammad Rafli
 Shazuan Ashraf Mathews
 Saifeddine Alami
 Ismail H'Maidat
 Brahim Sabaouni
 Alexis André Jr.
 Anfernee Dijksteel
 Delvin Pinheiro Frederico
 Lars Herlofsen
 Myer Bevan
 Kayro Flores Heatley
 Fernando Canales
 José Guidino
 Matty Cash
 Maksim Boychuk
 Artemi Ukomsky
 Petar Golubović
 Cameron Edwards
 Reyaad Pieterse
 Moon Seon-min
 Pontus Almqvist
 Apirat Heemkhao
 Napapon Sripratheep
 Gonzalo Balbi

References

Football academies in England
Nike, Inc.
2009 establishments in England
Association football clubs established in 2009